Annetta is a town in Parker County, Texas, United States. The population was 1,288 at the 2010 census.

The town is named after the daughter of the founder of the town, a Mr. Fraser who built a station and general store in the area in the mid-1870s.

Geography

Annetta is located at  (32.697574, –97.654333).

Demographics

2020 census

As of the 2020 United States census, there were 3,041 people, 880 households, and 788 families residing in the town.

2000 census
As of the census of 2000, there were 1,108 people, 361 households, and 324 families residing in the town. The population density was 510.5 people per square mile (197.1/km2). There were 368 housing units at an average density of 169.6 per square mile (65.5/km2). The racial makeup of the town was 97.38% White, 0.36% African American, 0.45% Native American, 0.09% Asian, 0.81% from other races, and 0.90% from two or more races. Hispanic or Latino of any race were 2.35% of the population.

There were 361 households, out of which 53.5% had children under the age of 18 living with them, 82.5% were married couples living together, 5.3% had a female householder with no husband present, and 10.0% were non-families. 8.3% of all households were made up of individuals, and 2.2% had someone living alone who was 65 years of age or older. The average household size was 3.07 and the average family size was 3.26.

In the town, the population was spread out, with 33.5% under the age of 18, 5.0% from 18 to 24, 26.3% from 25 to 44, 28.3% from 45 to 64, and 6.9% who were 65 years of age or older. The median age was 39 years. For every 100 females, there were 98.2 males. For every 100 females age 18 and over, there were 95.5 males.

The median income for a household in the town was $80,904, and the median income for a family was $82,157. Males had a median income of $61,375 versus $40,057 for females. The per capita income for the town was $25,785. About 2.2% of families and 2.9% of the population were below the poverty line, including 3.4% of those under age 18 and 2.7% of those age 65 or over.

Education

Public schools
The Town of Annetta is served by the Aledo Independent School District.

See also
 Homa J. Porter

References

External links
 Town of Annetta

Dallas–Fort Worth metroplex
Towns in Parker County, Texas
Towns in Texas